Cartoon Network Korea is the South Korean version of the original United States television channel, which launched on 11 November 2006. It is owned by Warner Bros. Discovery under its International division, and primarily shows animated programming.

History

1995–2006: Predecessors 
In 1995, Orion Cartoon Network was launched. The channel's logo had nothing to do with Cartoon Network, instead using Orion's logo with the text 오리온카툰네트워크 next to it. The channel would later be renamed Tooniverse.

The rebranded channel aired a Cartoon Network block until December 2002, when they lost the contract. At the same time, CSTV started distributing the pan-Asian feed of the channel, but only in English, as Korean laws at the time imply that channels operating outside of South Korea are forbidden to carry Korean audio or subtitles within South Korean territory. Previously, Cartoon Network Japan was relayed on certain cable TV providers across South Korea.

On 12 July 2006, Turner and JoongAng Media Network signed a deal to launch an official Korean version of Cartoon Network Asia.

2006–2008: CN City Era 
On 11 November 2006, Cartoon Network Korea was launched, replacing the pan-Asian version on certain South Korean TV providers (but the process wasn't completed until 2011). At first, it used the "CN City" branding seen on many Cartoon Network channels worldwide with bumpers featuring well-known characters from Cartoon Network shows interacting in a CGI city composed of sets from them.

In 2006, several new series premiered, including Robotboy, The Life and Times of Juniper Lee, Camp Lazlo, Hi Hi Puffy AmiYumi, My Gym Partner's a Monkey and Squirrel Boy. The Cartoon Cartoons moniker previously used for the Cartoon Network originals was also dropped in 2006.

2009–2011: New Wave Era 
In July 2009, Cartoon Network Korea's on-air style was changed, and two of its movie blocks (Cartoon Network Theatre and Fridays Flicks) merged into one umbrella branding (Cartoon Network Popcorn).

Like Cartoon Network Asia, the new branding featured a major visual theme in the form of dynamic lines, shown on the network's official website and in all station IDs. During the New Wave era, much of Cartoon Network's comedy programs (such as Foster's Home for Imaginary Friends and Camp Lazlo) began to be shown much less frequently in favor of more anime (such as Kiteretsu Daihyakka, Powerpuff Girls Z and Kaibutsu-kun) and action-oriented shows (such as Ben 10, Ben 10: Alien Force, and The Secret Saturdays).

2011–2014: Exciting Fun Era, Turner Broadcasting directly manage Cartoon Network Korea 
On 26 December 2011, Cartoon Network Korea introduced the "CHECK it" branding and own slogan, 신나는 재미 (Exciting Fun). On 15 March 2012, the United States–Korea Free Trade Agreement went effective which allowed Turner Broadcasting to directly manage Cartoon Network Korea starting from March 2015. On November 14, local version of Boomerang Korea was launched in South Korea.

2022–present: Redraw Your World Era 
On 8 January 2022, Cartoon Network Korea began using the "Redraw Your World" branding used in the United States, Hong Kong, Taiwan, and Southeast Asia. The new look of the channel features updated colors, music and design. Its new shows are designed to appeal to an even broader demographic.

Cartoonito 
On 28 March 2022, the Cartoonito block was launched in South Korea.

Programming

See also 
 Cartoon Network
 Nickelodeon Korea
 Tooniverse
 Disney Channel Korea

References

External links 
  
 TV-schedule/TV-guide 

Cartoon Network
Anime television
Anime and Cartoon television
Television channels and stations established in 2006
Children's television channels in South Korea
Korean-language television stations
2006 establishments in South Korea